Lounger may refer to:

 Lounger (horse), a racehorse
 "Lounger" (song), a 2004 song by British band Dogs Die in Hot Cars
 Lounge chair